Stephen Warnock (born 12 December 1981) is an English former professional footballer who played as a defender.

Starting off his career at Liverpool, he went on to also represent Coventry City, Bradford City, Blackburn Rovers, Aston Villa, Bolton Wanderers, Leeds United, Derby County, Wigan Athletic and Burton Albion during a career that spanned between 2002 and 2018. A full international between 2008 and 2010, he was capped twice by the England national team and was part of the nation's squad at the 2010 FIFA World Cup.

Club career

Liverpool
Warnock was born in Ormskirk, Lancashire where, in his childhood, he played for Rufford Colts (based at St Bede's RC High School) and also played for St Bede's RC High School. Following his time spent in the Liverpool youth academy and England youth set up, with his first international cap in the under-16s, he had loan spells at Bradford City (where he scored his first career goal against Sheffield Wednesday) and Coventry City.

Warnock made his first-team debut for Liverpool against Grazer AK in 2004, during the first leg of a UEFA Champions League third qualifying round match. In his second season (2005–06), he was asked to play primarily at left back, in rotation with John Arne Riise. Warnock scored his only goal for Liverpool against Fulham in a 5–1 win on 15 March 2006.

Blackburn Rovers
In a media speculated swap deal, Blackburn's captain Lucas Neill was reported to being changing clubs with Warnock in both summer 2006 and winter 2007. Eventually Neill joined West Ham United, while on 22 January 2007 Warnock joined Blackburn Rovers for an undisclosed fee believed to be £1.5m. He made his debut in the FA Cup fourth round in a 4–0 away victory over Luton Town.

On 31 January 2007, he played his first Premier League match for Rovers against Chelsea. He was dismissed for the match after two cautions in the 2–1 victory over Sheffield United on 3 February 2007. Warnock scored his first goal for Blackburn in the 3–0 victory over Portsmouth on 25 February 2007.

On 11 April 2009, before Blackburn Rovers' match against Warnock's former club Liverpool, Stephen presented a flower display displaying the numbers '96' in reference to the 96 Liverpool supporters who lost their lives in the Hillsborough disaster on 15 April 1989. Before the kick off Warnock presented the flowers in front of famous Spion Kop on behalf of Blackburn. This was greeted with chants of 'Stephen Warnock' from the Kop.

Aston Villa

On 26 August 2009, it was confirmed that Aston Villa were in talks with Blackburn over a possible move for Warnock to the Villa Park club. The next day it was confirmed that Warnock had signed a four-year contract with Villa. He scored his first goal for Villa in the League Cup semi-final second leg victory over former club Blackburn Rovers on 20 January 2010, which ended 6–4 to Aston Villa.

From December 2010 onwards, Warnock was out of favour with Aston Villa manager Gérard Houllier and was forced to play with the reserve team. Warnock was widely expected to leave the club in the summer transfer window, with a number of teams reportedly interested in his signature. However, new manager Alex McLeish stated that he was impressed with Warnock's "phenomenal" attitude, and stated he would be given a clean slate, as with other players excluded by Houllier, all but guaranteeing his place in the squad. On 15 October 2011, Warnock scored his first league goal away at Manchester City. Warnock made 34 appearances for Villa during the 2011–12 season, missing only three Premier League fixtures. During the 2012–13 season under new manager Paul Lambert, Warnock found his chances limited and was made to train with the development squad.

Loan to Bolton Wanderers
On 21 September 2012, Warnock joined Bolton Wanderers on a three-month loan deal. He was on the bench a day later in their 2–1 win against Sheffield Wednesday and made his debut in their next match, starting at left back in Bolton's 1–0 defeat against Crystal Palace. In his second appearance, at home against Leeds United, Warnock gave away a penalty (which was subsequently scored) as the match finished 2–2. Warnock would play 15 times for Bolton before returning to Villa.

Leeds United
On transfer deadline day 31 January 2013, Warnock signed a two-and-a-half-year contract at Leeds United. He made his Leeds debut on 9 February 2013, playing the whole match in the club's 2–2 draw against Wolverhampton Wanderers at Molineux. Warnock scored his first goal from the penalty spot for Leeds on 2 March 2013 in a 1–0 win against Millwall. Warnock was named as captain in Brian McDermott's first match in charge on 13 April against Sheffield Wednesday. Before joining Leeds, West Ham United manager Sam Allardyce revealed that Warnock had turned down signing for the Premier League club as Leeds had offered Warnock a longer contract.

In February 2014, in conditions such that, according to the Yorkshire Evening Post, "the ferocious wind was man-of-the-match and the rain would have stripped paint", Warnock's free kick from distance was caught by the wind and dropped over the goalkeeper's head to give Leeds a 2–1 win away to Yeovil Town.

Warnock scored the only goal in a 1–0 win against his former club Bolton on 30 August. During the course of the 2014–15 season, Warnock replaced Jason Pearce as the new Leeds captain. Warnock picked up an injury against Derby County on 30 December 2014, which kept Warnock out of the team and he was subsequently replaced at left back by Charlie Taylor, where Taylor came into the starting lineup for Leeds on 4 January 2015 in Leeds' FA Cup 1–0 defeat against Sunderland.

Derby County
On 15 January 2015, Warnock signed for Derby County for an undisclosed fee.

Wigan Athletic
Warnock joined Wigan Athletic on a one-year contract on 30 May 2016.

Burton Albion
On 26 June 2017, Warnock signed for Championship club Burton Albion on a free transfer on a one-year contract. He scored his first goal for Burton in a 2–1 win against Fulham on 16 September 2017.

Bradford City and retirement 
On 26 January 2018, Warnock joined Bradford City on loan for the rest of the 2017–18 season. In April 2018, he announced that he would retire at the end of the season.

International career
Warnock was capped by the England schools team before making one appearance for the under-16s against Norway on 6 April 1998.

Despite having made relatively few first team appearances for Liverpool, Warnock was called into the senior England squad for the first time on 29 August 2005, due to lack of cover in the squad at left back. He was again called into the squad by England coach Fabio Capello in May 2008 for the friendlies against the United States and Trinidad and Tobago. He made his England debut against the latter on 1 June coming on as a substitute for Wayne Bridge in the 84th minute.

After impressing with Aston Villa in the early 2009–10 season Warnock received a call up to the international squad once more for a friendly against Egypt. On 11 May 2010, Warnock was named in the 30-man provisional squad for the 2010 FIFA World Cup in South Africa. On 1 June 2010, he was named in the final 23-man selection by manager Fabio Capello, ahead of other left back Leighton Baines. Due to the widely accepted adeptness of Ashley Cole at left back, Warnock did not feature in any of England's matches during their short-lived run in the World Cup which ended against Germany. On 7 June 2010, he played in a friendly match against Platinum Stars before the tournament. This does not count towards a full cap, as it was not played against a full international side.

In May 2012, Scotland manager Craig Levein made an approach to Warnock to play for them. Warnock remained eligible for Scotland as his England caps all came in friendly matches.

Media work
Since his retirement, Warnock has become a regular football pundit on radio and television, covering the Premier League, Champions League, Europa League, Copa Libertadores, and EFL for the BBC, BT Sport, DAZN, Quest TV, and NBC Sports.

Career statistics

Club

International

Honours
Liverpool
UEFA Super Cup: 2005
FIFA Club World Championship runner-up: 2005

Aston Villa
Football League Cup runner-up: 2009–10

Wigan Athletic
Football League One: 2015–16

Individual
Coventry City F.C. Player of the Year: 2003–04
Blackburn Rovers Player of the Year: 2008–09

References

External links

1981 births
Living people
People from Ormskirk
Footballers from Lancashire
English footballers
Association football defenders
Liverpool F.C. players
Bradford City A.F.C. players
Coventry City F.C. players
Blackburn Rovers F.C. players
Aston Villa F.C. players
Bolton Wanderers F.C. players
Leeds United F.C. players
Derby County F.C. players
Wigan Athletic F.C. players
Burton Albion F.C. players
English Football League players
Premier League players
England schools international footballers
England youth international footballers
England international footballers
2010 FIFA World Cup players